Operator is the art house based in Berlin. The studio was founded in 2016 by Ania Catherine and Dejha Ti.

Overview 
Operator was founded in 2016 in Los Angeles by artists Ania Catherine and Dejha Ti. Catherine is a choreographer, and Ti is a human-computer interaction (HCI) technologist. The duo creates multimedia artworks and is known for their conceptual installations.

In 2021, the founders translated themes from their Lumen Prize-winning work, I'd rather be in a dark silence than into a crypto art collection exploring privacy and transparency on the blockchain called the Privacy Collection.

In June 2022, Operator created Let me check with the wife, their original marriage certificate turned into an NFT artwork.

Operator has won several awards, including the Immersive Environments award from the Lumen Prize,ADC Awards for Experiential Design, Motion/Film/Gaming Craft, and Fashion Innovation, MediaFutures "Artists for Media," and an Honorary Mention for the S+T+ARTS Prize.

References

External links 
 Official website

Houses in Berlin
Arts in Berlin